Pronoctua is a genus of moths of the family Noctuidae.

Species
 Pronoctua craboi Lafontaine, 1998
 Pronoctua peabodyae (Dyar, 1903)
 Pronoctua pyrophiloides (Harvey, 1876)
 Pronoctua typica Smith, 1894

References
Natural History Museum Lepidoptera genus database
Pronoctua at funet

Noctuinae